Walter Patrick Twinn (March 29, 1934 – October 30, 1997) was a Canadian Chief of the Sawridge First Nation starting in 1966, and Senator from 1990 to 1997. He took control as chief just after oil was discovered on Sawridge reserve land; with the royalties from that he created a legacy for the Sawridge band by building first the Sawridge hotel and then other buildings. His funeral was held at St. Peters Celestin Roman Catholic Church on November 4.

Born in Slave Lake, Alberta, he was appointed to the Senate in 1990 representing the senatorial division of Alberta and sitting as a Progressive Conservative. He served until his death in 1997.

He was married to Catherine and had nine children.

He died of a heart attack in 1997 after returning from a ceremonial sweat lodge.

References

External links
 
 The Aboriginal Newspaper of Alberta

1934 births
1997 deaths
Canadian senators from Alberta
Progressive Conservative Party of Canada senators
First Nations politicians
Indigenous leaders in Alberta
Indigenous Canadian senators